Ian Mason may refer to:

 Ian J. Mason, Australian ornithologist and taxonomist
 Ian Mason (cricketer) (1942–2017), New Zealand cricketer